Sir Moti Tikaram, KBE, CF (18 March 1925 – 17 May 2012) was a judge of the Supreme Court of Fiji, the first ombudsman of independent Fiji and a football administrator. He was the first local person to be appointed to the Supreme Court of Fiji. He served on numerous boards and committees and was the patron of several sporting organisations.

Legal and judicial career 
He was appointed Fiji's first Ombudsman in 1972. At the time of his retirement in 1987, he was the longest serving national ombudsman in the world. He was a member of the International Commission of Jurists from 1984 to 1989. After Fiji became a republic in 1987, he was re-appointed as a judge and served for many years as the President of the Fiji Court of Appeal.
He acted as Chief Justice of Fiji on many occasions.

Football administrator 
Tikaram was the President of the Fiji Football Association from 1959 to 1960 and is credited with making the Association multi-racial and initiating moves to have its name changed from Fiji Indian Football Association.

Awards 
 In 2007, he was awarded with Pravasi Bharatiya Samman by the Ministry of Overseas Indian Affairs.
 In 2009, was awarded the  "Sardar Vallabhbhai Patel Award" in New Delhi, India at the Indian Diaspora Celebrations.

Family 

He was the great uncle of actor Ramon Tikaram and singer-songwriter Tanita Tikaram.

References

Sources
 "A distinguished path": biography by the Fiji Times, July 16, 2009

1925 births
2012 deaths
People educated at Marist Brothers High School, Fiji
20th-century Fijian judges
Fijian Hindus
People from Suva
University of Auckland alumni
Knights Commander of the Order of the British Empire
Supreme Court of Fiji justices
Ombudsmen in Fiji
People from Lami, Fiji
Recipients of Pravasi Bharatiya Samman